Royal Police College  may refer to:

 Royal Malaysian Police College Kuala Lumpur, Malaysia
 Royal New Zealand Police College, New Zealand